Northlands Shopping Centre, in Christchurch, New Zealand, is the South Island's second-largest mall. Founded in 1967, it is owned by Kiwi Property Group.

The Shopping centre is single-level, with over 120 tenants, including shops, bars, cafés and restaurants. It also has a multistorey car park. The main occupants of the shopping centre are Farmers department store, The Warehouse retail store, Hoyts cinema, Pak'nSave supermarket, and Countdown supermarket. The mall was extended with addition of food court, "winter garden" style dining conservatory, and outdoor seating area.

History 
Plans for the shopping centre were announced in July 1966. The first stage would be the construction of a  Hay's department store and supermarket, with the second stage being the construction of the  mall with a variety store, supermarket and around 25 specialty stores. The entire shopping centre would include off-street parking for 500-600 cars and would cost £1 million to construct. Construction began on the Hay's store in September 1966 followed by the mall in February 1967.

The Hay's store opened to shoppers on 18 October 1967, with the full shopping centre with 22 stores opening two weeks later on 1 November 1967. On the opening day of the Hay's store, traffic trying to enter the carpark backed up along Main North Road, at times blocking the Harewood Road roundabout 200 metres south of the shopping centre. On 3 November 1967, the shopping centre's first Friday late-night opening, traffic backed up along Main North Road and Papanui Road at times as far back as Blighs Road, 700 metres south of the shopping centre.

The building was extensively strengthened after the 2011 Christchurch earthquake.

Gallery

References

Shopping centres in New Zealand
Buildings and structures in Christchurch
1967 establishments in New Zealand
1970s architecture in New Zealand

External links